The 4th Cavalry is an armoured regiment of the Pakistan Army. It was previously a regular cavalry regiment of the British Indian Army. The regiment suffered heavy losses as part of the 1st Armoured Division in the Battle of Asal Uttar during the Indo-Pakistani War of 1965. It was raised again in 1980.

The unit is equipped with T-80UD tanks.

Battles 
 Battle of Asal Uttar, Indo-Pakistani War of 1965

See also 
 4th Cavalry (India), a former regiment of the British Indian Army
 4th Horse (Hodson's Horse), an armoured regiment of the Indian Army

References 

Armoured regiments of Pakistan
Military units and formations established in 1980